The following is the filmography of American actor and comedian Eddie Murphy that includes his work in film and television.

Film

Television

Theme parks

Music videos

References

External links 
 

Male actor filmographies
Filmography
American filmographies